Brooks is a house near Boconnoc in Cornwall, England, UK.

References

Houses in Cornwall